Eine Fredriksson (born 5 March 1950) is a Swedish former football player.

During his club career, Fredriksson played for GAIS and IFK Norrköping.

Fredriksson made 20 appearances for the Sweden national football team between 1974 and 1980, scoring 3 goals.

External links

1950 births
Swedish footballers
Sweden international footballers
GAIS players
IFK Norrköping players
Association football midfielders
Living people